The 2016 CSIO Gijón was the 2016 edition of the Spanish official show jumping horse show, at Las Mestas Sports Complex in Gijón. It was held as CSIO 5*.

This edition of the CSIO Gijón was held between 24 and 29 August 2016.

Nations Cup
The 2016 Furussiyia FEI Nations Cup of Spain was part of the European Division 2 in the 2016 Furussiya FEI Nations Cup and was held on Saturday, 2 September 2016. Great Britain was the only team that could win points for the ranking.

The Cup was a show jumping competition with two rounds. The height of the fences were up to 1.60 meters. The best eight teams of the eleven which participated were allowed to start in the second round. The competition was endowed with €76,000. France won its 11th Nations Cup in Gijón.

Gijón Grand Prix
The Gijón Grand Prix, the Show jumping Grand Prix of the 2016 CSIO Gijón, was the major show jumping competition at this event. The sponsor of this competition was Banco Sabadell Herrero. It was held on Monday 29 August 2016. The competition was a show jumping competition over two rounds, the height of the fences were up to 1.60 meters.

It was endowed with 153,701 €.

(Top 10 of 45 Competitors)

Winners by day

References

External links
Official website of CSIO Gijón
All results of the CSIO Gijón 2016

CSIO Gijón
2016 in show jumping
FEI Nations Cup